KSCW-LP is a low-power radio station ("103.1 on your FM dial") located in Sun City West, Arizona. KSCW's license is owned by Recreation Centers of Sun City West, Inc., and the station is run entirely by a volunteer staff (through the Sun City West Broadcast Club) and is funded primarily through fundraisers. KSCW features a wide variety of programming.

History

In 2013, the Sun City West Broadcast Club was chartered by the Recreation Centers of Sun City West. In 2014, the club obtained an LPFM license. A  antenna was erected outside the station on June 18, 2015, while the station began broadcasting online that fall.

See also
 List of radio stations in Arizona

References

External links
 

SCW-LP
SCW-LP
Radio stations established in 2017
2017 establishments in Arizona
Community radio stations in the United States